Kabud Ban (also Romanized as Kabūd Bān, Kabūdbān; also known as Kabūdīān, Kabūdābād, and Kabūd Bād) is a village in Doab Rural District, in the Central District of Selseleh County, Lorestan Province, Iran. At the 2006 census, its population was 69, in 14 families.

References 

Towns and villages in Selseleh County